Workplace communication is the process of exchanging information and ideas, both verbally and non-verbally between one person or group and another person or group within an organization. It includes e-mails, videoconferencing, text messages, notes, calls, etc. Effective communication is critical in getting the job done, as well as building a sense of trust and increasing productivity. Workers may have different cultures and backgrounds, and may expect different ways of working and understanding how things should be done within an organization's workplace culture. To strengthen employee cooperation and avoid missed deadlines or activity that could affect the company negatively, effective communication is crucial. Ineffective communication leads to communication gaps, which causes confusion, wastes time, and reduces productivity. Managers and lower-level employees must be able to interact clearly and effectively with each other through verbal communication and non-verbal communication to achieve specific business goals. Effective communication with clients also plays a vital role in the development of an organization and the success of any business. When communicating, nonverbal communication must also be taken into consideration. How a person delivers a message has a large impact.

Another important aspect of effective workplace communication is taking into consideration the different backgrounds of employees. "While diversity enriches the environment, it can also cause communication barriers." Difficulties arise when a coworker's cultural background leads him or her to think differently than another. It is for this reason that knowing about intercultural communication at work and learning how to treat others without offending them can bring several benefits to the company.

Workplace communication can be more than the transmission of facts and direct expectations. This communication can be about the forming of relationships amongst the staff and stakeholders, i.e. those inside or outside the organization that are affected in some way by the organization (a simple example would be stockholders).  The communication that builds relationships can form or be affected by organizational culture.

Method of communication

Different people absorb information in different ways. To make sure that the information conveyed is understood by all, the method used for communication must be simple, clear, and precise. When presenting vital information, using pictures can aid understanding. The presence of trust in an organization will also simplify the use of communication. Relationships must be established between coworkers to create a tension-free workplace. Messages should be sent and received with no alterations. To achieve healthy relationships in the workplace, behaviors such as bullying, taking credit for someone else's work and free-riding should be avoided. These will create toxic relationships that will, in the long run, negatively impact an organization and its productivity. Adequate importance can be given to discussion, questions and clarifications.

Emails have become an important channel of workplace communication, and this has decreased other forms of communication.  Due in part because of the lack of emotional context email can provide and the lessening of other types of communications (ex: why call or walk to your cubicle when one can email) the workplace can get tenser because of miscommunications.

Content

The content of the information plays a major role in workplace communication. The level of detail must fit the recipient's capacity for understanding. Too much detail may bore a person and too little detail won't make them involved. Keeping information digestible by condensing text from large chunks of information to quick, memorable snippets will keep readers engaged. Quick posts or emails can keep communication brief and allow for more consistent engagement. Providing visuals or interactive elements can support those who are visual learners.

Use of jargon is not considered good for effective workplace communication. Jargon should be avoided if it alienates the other party. This could be related to generational slang, such as "being a stan" or more technical shorthand. Additionally, outside the organization, others may not know what you are talking about, such as if you are a computer salesperson and start talking about a BIOS.

However, jargon is useful within an organization where its meaning has been firmly established. It helps save time with communication, and if talking to others within your field, enhances your credibility by establishing you have a basic knowledge of the topic you are discussing with them. It all depends on context.

Frequency

While formal workplace communication that is done too rarely or too often is not good for an organization, frequent informal workplace communication has its benefits.  A perfect balance is required for the proper functioning of an organization. Information must be communicated as and when required rather than holding unnecessary meetings frequently. At the same time crucial information must not be withheld, instead, it must be communicated early to engage employees in the objectives of the organization. Another thing to consider is that there is formal and informal workplace communication. Informal communication is considered by employees to be the most frequent.

Skills

Getting the message across efficiently depends on the skills of the communicator such as presentation skills, group facilitation skills, negotiation, and written communication skills. Successful communication also depends upon the capacity of the employees to understand the information. This may require providing employees with basic financial literacy such as financial statements, sales, profitability, etc.

When selecting a candidate, most employers seek those with strong speaking and writing skills. Problem solving and self-motivation are also important skills in the workplace. These allow rapidly-changing environments to become less of a challenge.

Tools

With the fast evolution of technology, companies have to stay up-to-date with tools that facilitate communication. Some of these include email, blogs, instant messaging, collaboration software and social media sites such as Twitter and Facebook. It is important to keep in mind that sending an email, fax, or letter does not necessarily mean that communication has taken place. Only when a message has been sent, received, and understood by the intended receiver, it can be said that communication has occurred.

Even though they facilitate communication, studies have shown that communication tools may distract employees from their duties. Ultimately the question is asked whether staying connected outweighs being productive.  To reduce interruptions, methods such as employee training and changes in the environment can be implemented. Employees making themselves unavailable during specific times of the day or week can also help resolve this issue. This can increase concentration and as a result, productivity.

Barriers

Common barriers to effective communication in the workplace include:

 Environmental Barriers – these barriers are based on the location itself. Essentially, how easy it is to communicate and allow for focus within a given room. Examples of this could include a buzz in the room or an overheated office. These are distracting factors that hinder the easy flow and understanding of communication between the speaker and participant(s).

 Physical barriers: The physical structure, location, and construction of the workplace can act as a barrier to effective communication. Employees seated remotely from each other hinders effective interaction.
 Language barriers: Employees with different native languages may work in an organization. Everyone may not be comfortable or familiar with other languages, which creates a barrier to effective workplace communication. Differences in slang or register can create issues impeding proper work task completion.
 Cultural Barriers - within the global economy individuals and organizations often come into contact with those from other regions, countries, or groups who interact and communicate within a different set of norms and conventions. Additionally, they may have different organizational and cultural values and expectations. These "invisible barriers" can be overcome by diversity in the workplace and cultural training.
 Emotional barriers: Emotional barriers like fear, inferiority, shyness, lack of self confidence, and skills may stop an employee from communicating effectively with his or her colleagues.
 Perception barriers: Employees will have different experiences, values, preferences and attitudes. These may lead to a variety of assumptions and can act as a communication barrier.

See also
Business communication
Communication
E-leadership
Intercultural communication
Leadership
Leadership style

References

Communication theory